The 1983 Melbourne Cup was a two-mile handicap horse race which took place on Tuesday, 1 November 1983.

The race was won by Kiwi who came from a seemingly unwinnable position at the 400 meter mark to hit the front with 50 meters to go and beating Noble Comment by a length and three quarters Earlier in the same year he won the Wellington Cup becoming the first and only horse to win the Melbourne and Wellington Cup in the same year.

Field 

This is a list of horses which ran in the 1983 Melbourne Cup.

References

1983
Melbourne Cup
Melbourne Cup
1980s in Melbourne